Kevin Peter Hales (born 13 January 1961) is a football coach and former player. Before coaching, he played as a midfielder for Chelsea and Leyton Orient, managed Welling United and Erith & Belvedere, was assistant manager at Hornchurch and coached at Weymouth and Rushden & Diamonds.

References

1961 births
Living people
Sportspeople from Dartford
Association football midfielders
English footballers
Chelsea F.C. players
Leyton Orient F.C. players
English Football League players
English football managers
Welling United F.C. managers
Erith & Belvedere F.C. managers